Krambach is a village in New South Wales, Australia in Mid-Coast Council. The village lies on the Bucketts Way, southwest of Taree on the Mid North Coast. Its population in the 2006 census was 137.

Krambach has a community market on the third Sunday of each month from 9am to 1pm.

References

Mid North Coast
Suburbs of Mid-Coast Council
Towns in New South Wales